Galbinothrix is a fungal genus in the family Chrysotrichaceae. It is monotypic, containing the single species Galbinothrix caesiopruinosa, a corticolous (bark-dwelling) lichen.

Taxonomy
Both the genus and species were described as new to science in 2018 by Andreas Frisch, Göran Thor, Kwang Hee Moon, and Yoshihito Ohmura. The genus name combines the Latin galbinus ("greenish-yellow") with the suffix thrix, which alludes to its relationship with the genus Chrysothrix; the species epithet refers to the ascomata, which are bluish grey ascomata and pruinose.

Description
Galbinothrix caesiopruinosa has a thin, discontinuous thallus that ranges in color from pale to dark greyish-green to yellowish-olive; the thallus patches, which are partly , measure about 0.1–0.3 mm in diameter. Usnic acid and isousnic acid are lichen products found in the species; it does not contain pulvinic acid derivatives, which contrasts it with similar species in the Arthoniaceae, such as Chrysothrix caesia.

Habitat and distribution
Galbinothrix caesiopruinosa occurs in Japan, including Hokkaido and central Honshu, and in the eastern mountain range of South Korea. Common and widespread in this region, it has been collected from shady and humid forests, as well as from planted trees along roadsides and in parking lots. Host trees include maple, alder, and ash.

References

Arthoniomycetes
Lichen genera
Taxa described in 2018
Arthoniomycetes genera